Anton Stråka (born 6 April 1998) is a Finnish professional ice hockey player who is currently contracted as a centre for JYP Jyväskylä of the Liiga.

Playing career
He originally played as a youth and made his professional debut with JYP Jyväskylä of the Liiga.

After three parts seasons in the Finnish Liiga, Stråka left out of contract and moved to the Austrian Hockey League, agreeing to a one-year contract with the Dornbirn Bulldogs on 1 September 2020.

He returned Finland after the completion of his contract with Dornbirn on 8 July 2021.

References

External links

1998 births
Living people
Dornbirn Bulldogs players
JYP Jyväskylä players
Finnish ice hockey centres
Peliitat Heinola players
People from Nykarleby
Sportspeople from Ostrobothnia (region)